The Curtiss A-12 Shrike was the United States Army Air Corps' second monoplane ground-attack aircraft, and its main attack aircraft through most of the 1930s. It was based on the A-8, but had a radial engine instead of the A-8's inline, water-cooled engine, as well as other changes.

Design and development

The Model 60 was developed from advancements of the A-8 and the experimental YA-10. However, it became obsolete after a short use period, mainly because of fast-improving aviation technology, as well as the USAAC's desire for multi-engined attack aircraft.

The most obvious difference between the A-12 and the A-8 is the air-cooled, radial engine in the A-12, which replaced the A-8's inline, water-cooled engine. This was a response to the USAAC's move toward a preference for radial engines, especially in attack aircraft. The rationale behind this preference is that the radial engine has a lower profile, making it less vulnerable to ground fire, and a simpler cooling mechanism, which is also less prone to groundfire, as well as overall maintenance problems.

These aircraft retained the open cockpit introduced in the A-8 production batch, and carried the same weapons load. In an attempt to improve pilot/observer co-operation, the rear cockpit was moved forward sufficiently for its glazed covering to form a continuation of the fuselage decking behind the pilot's cockpit.

Nine USAAF A-12s were still in service at Hickam Field on 7 December 1941, but they saw no combat.

Serial numbers: 33-212/257

Operational history
A-12s served with the 3rd Attack Group plus the 8th and 18th Pursuit Groups. Surviving Shrikes were grounded just after Pearl Harbor was bombed in December 1941.

On 15 August 1937, during the start of the Sino-Japanese War/World War II in the Battle of Shanghai, the Imperial Japanese Navy launched 45 planes from the fleet aircraft carrier Kaga targeting Chinese Air Force assets in the province of Jiangsu surrounding Shanghai; thirteen Aichi D1A1 dive-bombers were unable to find their intended target in Suzhou and so diverted to Jianqiao Airbase instead, but stumbled upon A-12 Shrikes of the 26th and 27th Squadrons of the 9th Attack Group at the Chao'er auxiliary airbase preparing for strikes against Japanese positions in Shanghai, and a dogfight ensued between two unlikely dogfighting opponents: two D1A1s were shot down by the Chinese A-12s, and another badly shot-up D1A1 returned to Kaga with a fatally wounded crewman.

Operators

Chinese Nationalist Air Force received 20 A-12 Shrikes in 1936, arming the 27th and the 28th Squadron of the 9th Group. When full-scale war broke out between Japan and China, they were used. The initial success including the downing of four Japanese Aichi D1A1 carrier-based dive bombers on 15 August 1937. However, after deploying in ground support missions in Shanxi, most did not survive and the few left were reassigned to training duties.

United States Army Air Corps

Specifications (A-12 Shrike)

See also

References
Notes

Bibliography

Eden, Paul and Soph Moeng, eds. The Complete Encyclopedia of World Aircraft. London: Amber Books Ltd., 2002, .
Fitzsimons, Bernard, ed. The Illustrated Encyclopedia of the 20th Century Weapons and Warfare, Vol. 21. London: Purnell & Sons Ltd., 1969, First edition 1967. .
Andrade, John M. . U.S Military Aircraft Designations and Serials since 1909. Leicester: Midland Counties Publications, 1979. .
Swanborough, F. G. and Peter M. Bowers. United States Military aircraft since 1909. London: Putnam, 1963, 1971, 1989. .
Bowers, Peter M. . Curtiss Aircraft 1907-1947. London: Putnam, 1979, 1987. .
 Cheung, Raymond. OSPREY AIRCRAFT OF THE ACES 126: Aces of the Republic of China Air Force. Oxford: Bloomsbury Publishing Plc, 2015. .

External links

USAF Museum:
Attack Aircraft Development in the 1930s
Curtiss A-12
"Flying Fort Bristles With Guns And Bombs", Popular Mechanics, March 1934, 1930s era article on A-12 with a lot of misconceptions

Low-wing aircraft
Single-engined tractor aircraft
A-12, Curtiss
World War II ground attack aircraft of the United States
A-12 Shrike
Aircraft first flown in 1933